Geoffrey W. Stevens (January 16, 1891 – February 7, 1963) was a Canadian politician. He represented the electoral districts of Halifax East and Halifax County Dartmouth in the Nova Scotia House of Assembly from 1933 to 1960. He was a member of the Nova Scotia Liberal Party.

Stevens was born in 1891 at Dartmouth, Nova Scotia. He was educated at Dalhousie University, and was a pharmacist by career. He married Helen Lithgow Bauld in 1914.

Stevens entered provincial politics in the 1933 election, defeating Conservative incumbent Josiah Frederick Fraser in the newly established Halifax East riding. He was re-elected in the 1937, 1941, and 1945 elections. In April 1946, Stevens was appointed to the Executive Council of Nova Scotia as Minister for the Nova Scotia Liquor Control Act. He retained the portfolio through re-elections in 1949 and 1953. In the 1956 election, Stevens was re-elected in the new Halifax County Dartmouth riding. He did not reoffer in the 1960 election. Stevens died at Dartmouth on February 7, 1963.

References

1891 births
1963 deaths
Dalhousie University alumni
Members of the Executive Council of Nova Scotia
Nova Scotia Liberal Party MLAs
People from Dartmouth, Nova Scotia